Muhammad Ashab Uddin is an Indian Bengali politician and social worker. He is two times member of the Manipur Legislative Assembly, and formerly served as Pradhan for two terms.

Early life and education
Muhammad Ashab Uddin was born on 1 October 1966, to a Bengali Muslim family that has been settled in Manipur for over a century. His father was Muhammad Turpan Ali of Sonapur, an employee of the Department of Education in Manipur and the headmaster of Lalpani Aided J. B. School from 1966 to 2004. In 1963, Turpan Ali became the first Muslim to pass the University of Gauhati-conducted Class Tenth Exam. His grandfather, Muhammad Ghulam Rashid, was former Pradhan of Sonapur from 1975 to 1980.

Uddin completed his education until class 12, and lives in Babupara, Imphal.

Career
Ashab Uddin participated in the 2017 Manipur Legislative Assembly election from Jiribam constituency in Imphal East district. Despite being an independent candidate, he defeated his rival Thoudam Debendra Singh of the Indian National Congress, becoming the first member of the Jiribam minority community to win an election. He resigned on 29 January 2022.
In 2022 Manipur Assembly election, Ashab Uddin was again elected, now as JD(U) candidate.

References

Living people
1966 births
Manipur politicians
Manipur MLAs 2017–2022
21st-century Bengalis
Manipur MLAs 2022–2027
Janata Dal (United) politicians from Manipur